Arranged/Played/Composed by Jack Montrose is an album by saxophonist Jack Montrose recorded in 1955 for the Atlantic label.

Reception

A review for AllMusic by Al Campbell states: "Tenor saxophonist Montrose was from the West Coast school of cool jazz, and was significantly influenced by classical music. On this date he was thinking specifically about utilizing every instrument in structured chamber-esque arrangements. Montrose managed to achieve his goal of leading a swinging improvised jazz session without being restricted by this rigid structure".

Track listing
All compositions by Jack Montrose except as indicated
 "A Little Duet" - 5:01
 "April's Fool" - 5:06
 "Dot's Groovy" - 4:44
 "I'm Gonna Move to the Outskirts of Town" (William Weldon, Andy Razaf) - 5:48
 "Cecilia" (Dave Dreyer, Harry Ruby) - 4:37
 "The News and the Weather" - 4:20
 "When You Wish upon a Star" (Leigh Harline, Ned Washington) - 3:35
 "Have You Met Miss Jones?" (Richard Rodgers, Lorenz Hart) - 5:17 	
 "Paradox" - 4:03

Personnel 
Jack Montrose - tenor saxophone, arranger
Bob Gordon - baritone saxophone  
Paul Moer - piano
Red Mitchell - bass
Shelly Manne - drums

References 

1955 albums
Atlantic Records albums
Jack Montrose albums
Albums produced by Nesuhi Ertegun